Zeb Ejiro, MFR is a Nigerian filmmaker and producer. He is one of the two brothers of Chico Ejiro, a veteran Nigerian filmmaker and producer.

In November 2005, Zeb received a National award of Order of the Federal Republic alongside Lere Paimo in recognition of his immense contributions to the Nigerian film industry.

Filmography 

 Domitila (1996)  
 Nneka the Pretty Serpent (1994) 
 Mortal Inheritance (1996)
 Sakobi the snake girl (1998) 
 A night in the Philippines (2005) 
 Pure honey (2017)  
 Merciful 
 Extreme Measure (2003)  
 Domitilla II 
 Sakobi II:. the final battle 
 A night in the Philippines II 
 Mortal sin

Awards
Order of the Federal Republic (2005)

See also
 List of Nigerian film producers

References

Living people
Male actors from Delta State
Nigerian film producers
Year of birth missing (living people)
Nigerian male film actors